Saale is a river of Lower Saxony, Germany. It is a left tributary of the Leine. Its source is near the village Duingen. It flows into the Leine in Elze.

See also
List of rivers of Lower Saxony

References

Rivers of Lower Saxony
Rivers of Germany